Marcus Christopher David Hamilton (born February 17, 1984) is a former American football cornerback. He was drafted by the Tampa Bay Buccaneers in the seventh round of the 2007 NFL Draft. He played college football at Virginia.

Hamilton was also a member of the Chicago Bears and Las Vegas Locomotives.

Early years
Marcus Hamilton played high school football at Centreville High School in Clifton, Virginia.

Marcus's father Greg was a teacher and high school football coach in the Fairfax County Public Schools system.

Professional career

First stint with Buccaneers
Hamilton was promoted to the active roster on September 19, 2008 after cornerback Elbert Mack was suspended. Hamilton made his professional debut on September 21, 2008 as the Tampa Bay Buccaneers beat the Chicago Bears. The Buccaneers waived him on September 22.

Chicago Bears
Hamilton failed to clear waivers and was claimed by the Chicago Bears on September 23. An exclusive-rights free agent in the 2009 offseason, Hamilton signed his one-year tender offer on March 12, 2009. He was informed of his release on September 5, 2009.

Second stint with Buccaneers
Hamilton re-signed with the Buccaneers on September 23, 2009. He was waived on October 5.

References

1984 births
Living people
American football cornerbacks
Chicago Bears players
Las Vegas Locomotives players
Tampa Bay Buccaneers players
Virginia Cavaliers football players
Sportspeople from Fairfax County, Virginia
Players of American football from Virginia
People from Fairfax, Virginia